KCCK may refer to:

KCCK-FM, a radio station (88.3 FM) licensed to serve Cedar Rapids, Iowa, United States
Kahani Comedy Circus Ki